East Earltown is a community in the Canadian province of Nova Scotia, located in  Colchester County .

External links
 East Earltown on Destination Nova Scotia

Communities in Colchester County
General Service Areas in Nova Scotia